Lombardy is an unincorporated community located in northern Sunflower County, Mississippi.

Notable people
Wade Walton, blues musician, was born in Lombardy.

References

Unincorporated communities in Sunflower County, Mississippi
Unincorporated communities in Mississippi